Cristóbal Fernández is a Mexican actor, and former professional footballer for the Estudiantes Tecos Club of the Liga Premier de México. He is best known for playing Dani Rojas in the Apple TV+ comedy series Ted Lasso.

Early life
Fernández was born on January 27, 1991, in Guadalajara, Jalisco. Aside from his native Spanish, he is fluent in English, German, French, and Italian. He found a love for football at a young age. His passion for football earned him a slot on Guadalajara's Estudiantes Tecos Club at the age of 15. Unfortunately, a devastating knee injury ultimately ended his career as a professional footballer. Following the encouragement of his parents, he decided to pursue a second career, and fell in love with acting while in college.

Career
After moving to London, Fernández further pursued acting. Following a stint in several indie movies, Fernández was cast in the Apple TV+ comedy series Ted Lasso, a series that has received global acclaim.

Fernández is also the founder of film production company Espectro MX Films.

Fernández also starred in a Microsoft commercial for the game Forza Horizon 5, along with Karol G, called "The Getaway Driver".

Filmography

Film

Television

References

External links
 

Living people
1991 births
21st-century Mexican actors
21st-century Mexican male actors
Artists from Guadalajara, Jalisco
Male actors from Guadalajara, Jalisco
Mexican emigrants to the United Kingdom
Footballers from Guadalajara, Jalisco
Mexican male film actors
Mexican male television actors
Mexican male video game actors
Tecos F.C. footballers
Association footballers not categorized by position
Association football players not categorized by nationality
Mexican footballers